Yuriy Anatoliyovych Boyko (born 9 October 1958) is a Ukrainian politician who served as one of the Vice Prime Ministers of Ukraine between 2012 and 2014, as well as the Minister of Energy from 2006 to 2007 and again from 2010 to 2012. Other than during stint as Vice Prime Minister, he has continuously served as a Member of the Verkhovna Rada since 2007. Boyko ran for President in the March 2019 election, winning many districts in the southeast of the country but ultimately coming fourth and narrowly missing qualification for the second round.  

Designated a Hero of Ukraine in 2004, Boyko is considered to be one of the primary proponents of closer relations with Russia in Ukrainian politics. Boyko was a leading figure of the now-banned Opposition Platform — For Life, which he led to second place in the July 2019 parliamentary election, and currently heads its successor, the Platform for Life and Peace. Following the 2022 Russian invasion of Ukraine, which he opposed, he reversed some of his pro-Russian stances, now supporting Ukraine's proposed accession to the European Union and backing President Volodymyr Zelensky's Servant of the People party in Parliament. Prior to his political career, he was an expert on oil and gas policy.

Early life and education
Yuriy Boyko was born on 9 October 1958, in Horlivka, Donetsk Oblast. In 1981 Boyko graduated from the D. Mendeleev University of Chemical Technology of Russia (chemical engineering), and in 2001 he graduated from Volodymyr Dahl East Ukrainian National University (engineering and economics).

Early career 
From 1981 to 1999, Boyko started as a master at an industrial site and rose to the title of Director General of the chemical plant Zarya in Rubezhnoye. Following that, from 1999 to 2001, he was Director General of JSC Lisichansknefteorgsintez (Lysychansk refinery), and from August 2001 to February 2002 Boyko served as chairman of the management board of JSC Ukrtatnafta (Kremenchug refinery). 

In February 2002 Boyko was appointed the chairman of NAC Naftogaz-Ukraine, and led the company until March 2005.

Political career

Yanukovych cabinet 
Boyko served as First Deputy Minister of Fuel and Energy of Ukraine from July 2003 to March 2005 in the cabinet of then-Prime Minister Victor Yanukovych. In late July 2004, he was also appointed in the coordination committee for RosUkrEnergo.

In the summer of 2005 President Viktor Yushchenko blocked the arrest of Boyko on suspicion of abuse of office while heading Naftogaz. This arrest had been ordered by Security Service of Ukraine Chairman Oleksandr Turchynov. 

During Ukrainian parliamentary elections in 2006, held the year after Boyko was elected the chairman of the Republican Party of Ukraine (RPU), the RPU joined the electoral alliance "Ne Tak!", yet they did not succeed to reach the 3% election threshold required by law to enter parliament. 

On 4 August 2006, he was appointed by Yanukovych as Minister of Fuel and Energy.  Holding office for over a year, on 18 December 2007, he was dismissed due to the upcoming parliamentary elections, which he successfully contested as member of the Party of Regions.

Azarov cabinet 
On 11 March 2010 Boyko was again appointed the Minister of Fuel and Energy of Ukraine by Prime Minister Mykola Azarov. On 9 December 2010, due to the optimisation of the system of central executive power in Ukraine (a.k.a. reorganisation of ministries), Yanukovych, who was now President of Ukraine, dismissed Boyko on a technicality and re-appointed him as Minister of Energy and Coal Industry.

On 24 December 2012, Boyko was promoted to the position of a Vice Prime Minister, responsible for ecology, natural resources, energy, coal industry and industrial policy. On 23 May 2013, the space sector was added to his functions.

Career after vice premiership 

On 29 March 2014, a Party of Regions convention decided to support Boyko's political opponent Mykhailo Dobkin as a candidate for the presidential election, and on 7 April 2014, the party's political council expelled Boyko amidst infighting. Boyko launched a last-minute presidential campaign himself to oppose Dodkin, receiving less than a percentage point of the electorate. 

In the 2014 Ukrainian parliamentary election he was again re-elected into parliament; this time heading the electoral list of Opposition Bloc. 

On 9 November 2018, Boyko and the party For life signed an agreement for cooperation in the 2019 Ukrainian presidential election and the parliamentary election of the same year called Opposition Platform-For life. The same day Opposition Bloc leading members Vadym Novynskyi and Borys Kolesnikov claimed the agreement was a "personal initiative" of Boyko and that Opposition Bloc had not taken any decisions on cooperation with For life. On 17 November 2018 Opposition Platform-For life nominated Boyko as its candidate in the 2019 Ukrainian presidential election. Boyko was excluded from the Opposition Bloc faction (the reason given was) "because they betrayed their voters" interests on 20 November 2018. Boyko's official nomination by Opposition Platform-For life was announced on 17 November. Because Opposition Platform-For life was not yet registered as a party in January 2019 it could not nominate him as a presidential candidate. Hence on 17 January 2019 Boyko submitted documents to the Central Election Commission of Ukraine for registration as a self-nominated candidate. In the election Boyko took fourth place with 11.67% of the total vote, just over 4% behind incumbent Petro Poroshenko, who therefore instead of Boyko progressed to the second round along with Volodymyr Zelenskyy. In the parliamentary election a few months later, Boyko led his Opposition Platform — For Life party to second place with 13.05% of the vote, becoming the main opposition party. 

His party was banned by the government following the 2022 Russian invasion of Ukraine for its pro-Russian stances, despite it having opposed the invasion itself.

Boyko reversed a number of his pro-Russian stances following the ban on his party, and later formed a new parliamentary group made up of former OPZZh members called Platform for Life and Peace, now backing the Servant of the People-government in parliament, alongside the other party made up of formerly pro-Russian politicians, Restoration of Ukraine.

Popularity 
Data shortly before the parliamentary elections in June 2019 suggested that Boyko was the second-ranked pick to be Prime Minister of Ukraine behind eventual appointee Oleksiy Honcharuk.

Controversies

Lobbying in the United States
Through an offshore scheme in 2005, Boyko funded a K-street lobbyist through which he would meet with top members of the United States Republican Party and other conservatives in the United States.

Offshore platform controversy
According to newspaper Dzerkalo Tyzhnia ("The Weekly Mirror"), in 2011 Boyko was cited confirming the purchase of a modern offshore drilling platform from Singapore.  Dzerkalo Tyzhnia conducted an investigation into the tender surrounding the offshore platform, in which Highway Investment Processing LLC, a supposed offshore shell from Wales, UK, was the winner. The article stated that the Ukrainian state company Chornomornaftogaz, engaged in offshore oil and gas production in Azov and the Black Sea, paid over $400M for a drilling rig that costs $248M. Using Google Street View, journalists cited that Highway Investment Processing LLC appeared to be situated in an equipment store on the outskirts of Cardiff, Wales, and the LLC was further cited in the media as going through liquidation; however, the authorities suspended the liquidation process due to an investigation. Official records with the United Kingdom's Companies House indicated the company was incorporated on 12 December 2008 and was currently listed as active. Throughout the whole affair,  Boyko denied fraud allegations surrounding the purchase, citing additional equipment and movement costs and a "report from Halliburton" confirming the price of $400M. After Boyko labeled the Dzerkalo Tyzhnia journalists as "liars," the newspaper in turn filed a lawsuit against Boyko; the case is currently in appeals. The affair also sparked a scandal in Norway where Seadrill was accused of insufficient due diligence and KYC on its shell customer Highway Investment Processing LLC.

2016 assault
During a televised debate on 14 November 2016, Boyko punched politician Oleh Lyashko in the face after being called a "Kremlin agent."

Link to Dmytro Firtash
It is alleged that Boyko is "close associates" with the controversial businessman Dmytro Firtash.

Awards

 22 August 2004 - title Hero of Ukraine and the Order of the State, for outstanding personal service to the development of Ukrainian fuel and energy complex, and long-term commitment
 22 May 2003 - Order of Merit, III class, for good results in work and significant personal contribution to the development of oil and gas industry in Ukraine
 Order of Saint Seraphim of Sarov of the II class

Personal life 
He is married, together with his wife Vera he is raising 6 children. Boyko plays ice hockey, football, likes waterskiing and windsurfing.

Notes

References

External links

Living people
1958 births
People from Horlivka
D. Mendeleev University of Chemical Technology of Russia alumni
Republican Party of Ukraine politicians
Party of Regions politicians
Opposition Bloc politicians
Sixth convocation members of the Verkhovna Rada
Eighth convocation members of the Verkhovna Rada
Ninth convocation members of the Verkhovna Rada
Vice Prime Ministers of Ukraine
Fuel and energy ministers of Ukraine
Energy and coal industry ministers of Ukraine
Candidates in the 2014 Ukrainian presidential election
Candidates in the 2019 Ukrainian presidential election
Recipients of the Order of State
Chevaliers of the Order of Merit (Ukraine)
Pro-government people of the Euromaidan
Naftogaz people
Ukrainian chief executives
Ukrainian businesspeople in the oil industry